Annabel Steadman (born 1992), who writes as A. F. Steadman, is a British author.

Steadman was educated at The King's School, Canterbury, attending on music and academic scholarships followed by languages and law at Selwyn College, Cambridge, and a master's degree in creative writing at Cambridge.

In 2020, Steadman received a "seven-figure" three-book contract for a fantasy series about "bloodthirsty unicorns". This is believed to be the largest ever advance deal for a debut children's writer. In the same week film rights were acquired by Sony Pictures.

In 2022, Skandar and the Unicorn Thief, the first book in the Skandar series was published. The Sunday Times called it an "engrossing tale".
In November 2022, it was announced that Simon & Schuster had acquired three more books from Steadman. This will bring the Skandar series to five books, plus one untitled novel. The second book in the series, Skandar and the Phantom Rider will be published on 27 April 2023.

Publications
Skandar and the Unicorn Thief, Simon & Schuster, 2022

References

Living people
21st-century British novelists
Alumni of Selwyn College, Cambridge
People educated at The King's School, Canterbury
British children's writers
Year of birth missing (living people)